Ardoksho (Bactrian script Αρδοχϸο), also Romanised as Ardochsho, Ardokhsho and Ardoxsho, the Iranic goddess of wealth was a female deity of the Kushan Empire, in Central and South Asia during the early part of the 1st millennium CE. She is considered as an east Iranian goddess and alternate name of Lakshmi. She is known in the Avesta as Ashi.

She has often been regarded as analogous to the deity Hariti, found in some varieties of Buddhism. Analogies have also been drawn with the Persian goddess Anahita, the Greek Tyche, the Roman Fortuna and the Hindu Shri.

During the middle of the Kushan era, Ardoksho was usually the only deity other than a male counterpart, Oesho, depicted on Kushan coins.

References
 British Museum, 2017, Ardochsho (Biographical details)

South Asian deities
Kushan Empire
Goddesses